is a passenger railway station in located in the city of Kinokawa, Wakayama Prefecture, Japan, operated by the private railway company Wakayama Electric Railway.

Lines
Oikeyūen Station is served by the Kishigawa Line, and is located 11.3 kilometers from the terminus of the line at Wakayama Station.

Station layout
The station consists of one side platform connected to an open-fronted shelter containing a ticket machine by a level crossing. The station is unattended.

Adjacent stations

History
Oikeyūen Station opened on August 18, 1933.

Passenger statistics

Surrounding Area
Oike Pond

See also
List of railway stations in Japan

References

External links

  Oikeyūen Station timetable

Railway stations in Japan opened in 1933
Railway stations in Wakayama Prefecture
Kinokawa, Wakayama